
Gmina Kocmyrzów-Luborzyca is a rural gmina (administrative district) in Kraków County, Lesser Poland Voivodeship, in southern Poland.

Villages
Gmina Kocmyrzów-Luborzyca contains the villages and settlements of Baranówka, Czulice, Dojazdów, Głęboka, Goszcza, Goszyce, Kocmyrzów, Krzysztoforzyce, Łososkowice, Luborzyca, Łuczyce, Maciejowice, Marszowice, Pietrzejowice, Prusy, Rawałowice, Sadowie, Skrzeszowice, Sulechów, Wiktorowice, Wilków, Wola Luborzycka, Wysiółek Luborzycki and Zastów.

Neighbouring gminas
Gmina Kocmyrzów-Luborzyca is bordered by the city of Kraków and by the gminas of Igołomia-Wawrzeńczyce, Iwanowice, Koniusza, Michałowice and Słomniki.

References
Polish official population figures 2006

Kocmyrzow-Luborzyca
Gmina Kocmyrzow Luborzyca